Robert Patterson (1792–1881) was an American Civil War general, politician, and businessman.

Robert Patterson may also refer to:

 Robert Patterson (pioneer) (1753–1827), soldier in the American Revolution in Kentucky, a founder of Lexington and Cincinnati
 Robert Patterson (Belfast) (1802–1872), Irish businessman and naturalist
 Robert Lloyd Patterson (1836–1906), his son, Irish naturalist and linen merchant
 Robert Patterson (1863–1931), his nephew, Irish naturalist
 Robert H. Patterson Jr. (1927–2012), American attorney
 Robert Hogarth Patterson (1821–1886), Scottish journalist and author
 Robert J. Patterson (1809—1884), New Brunswick restaurateur
 Robert J. Patterson (American educator), American educator and professor
 Robert Patterson (educator) (1743–1824), surgeon in the American Revolution, educator, 4th director of the U.S. Mint
 Robert Maskell Patterson (1787–1854), American educator and 6th director of the U.S. Mint
 Robert Martin Patterson (born 1948), United States Army soldier and Medal of Honor recipient
 Robert P. Patterson (1891–1952), United States Secretary of War
 Robert Wilson Patterson (1850–1910), American newspaper editor and publisher
 Robert P. Patterson Jr. (1923–2015), U.S. federal judge
 Robert Patterson (Alberta politician) (1855–1938), member of the Legislative Assembly of Alberta
 Robert Patterson (sport shooter) (1875–?), South African Olympic sport shooter
 Robert Patterson (Australian politician) (1844–1907), Australian politician
 Robert Lincoln Patterson (1887–1940), member of the California legislature
 Robert Chandler Patterson (born 1959), baseball pitcher
 Robert B. Patterson (1921–2017), American plantation manager and college football player, founded the first White Citizens' Council in Indianola, Mississippi
 Robert C. Patterson (fl. 1900s), college football player and coach
 Robert U. Patterson (1877–1950), Surgeon General of the United States Army

See also
 Robert Paterson (disambiguation)
 Robert Pattinson (disambiguation)
 Rob Patterson (born 1970), American guitarist
 Bobby Patterson (disambiguation)
 Bob Patterson (disambiguation)